David Levine (1926–2009) was an American artist and illustrator.

David Levine may also refer to:
David D. Levine (born 1961), American science fiction writer
David F. Levine (born 1965), American author and physical therapy professor
David K. Levine (born c.1955), American economist and game theorist
David M. Levine (born 1970), American conceptual artist and professor
David Levine (politician) (1883–1972), Seattle, Washington politician
David Levine (photographer) (born 1960), British photographer
David Levine (executive), Canadian music and television executive
David Levine (racing driver) (born 1993), American racing driver
David B. Levine (born 1932), American orthopaedic surgeon, administrator, professor and historian of medicine

See also
Raphael David Levine (born 1938), Israeli chemist
David Levin (disambiguation)
David Levene (disambiguation)